Alfred Henry Jacobs (1882 – December 14, 1954) was an American architect. He designed theaters, hotels, and religious buildings. Three of the buildings he designed are listed on the National Register of Historic Places. 

His father Julius Jacobs was born in Prussia in 1840 and immigrated to California in 1853. In 1898 he was appointed Assistant U.S. Treasurer, in charge of the Sub-Treasury in San Francisco.

Alfred Henry Jacobs was born in San Francisco in 1882 to Julius and Sarah Adler Jacobs. He graduated from the California School of Mechanical Arts (now Lick-Wilmerding High School). He studied at University of California at Berkeley and the Massachusetts Institute of Technology where he received a B.S. degree in architecture in 1904 and an M.S. degree in architecture in 1905. He did further studies at the École des Beaux Arts in Paris.

Back in San Francisco by 1907, he partnered with Walter Ratcliff and helped design the Berkeley Tennis Club (1908). In 1909, he joined San Francisco's Fidelity Lodge, Number 120, Free and Accepted Masons of California and established his own firm.

He married Lillian Wollenberg in 1908.

Jacobs gained emeritus membership status with the American Institute of Architects. He was Jewish. He died on December 14, 1954.

The University of California, Berkeley has a collection of his papers, drawings, and photographs.

Work
Berkeley Tennis Club (1908)

Religious School House for Congregation Emanu-El (1910), now the Grabhorn Press building at 1337 Sutter Street in San Francisco, California Jacobs, Alfred Henry NRHP Listed

Herald Hotel, 308 Eddy St. San Francisco, CA. NRHP listed
Memorial for the Pacific Hebrew Orphan Asylum at the Home of Peace Cemetery in Colma, California
Commercial building at 1244-1268 Sutter Street (1911), later known as the Avalon Ballroom

Jacobs family's residence (1915) at 80 21st Avenue in San Francisco
California Theater (1916), renamed the State Theatre, at 787-799 Market Street in San Francisco, torn down in 1954
Winema Theater (1920) on Main Street in Scotia, California. Made with redwood.
Curran Theatre (1921–1922) at 445 Geary Street in San Francisco
Granada Theater (1920–1921) renamed the Paramount Theatre. Dismantled in 1965
 Homewood Terrace (1920–1921) for the Pacific Hebrew Orphan Asylum and Home Society, San Francisco
House for Ansel Adams (1929) at 129 24th Avenue in San Francisco
Butterfield and Butterfield Auctioneer building
Jewish orphanage (demolished)

See also
Gustave Albert Lansburgh

References

1882 births
1954 deaths
Architects from California
American people of German-Jewish descent
Jewish architects
20th-century American Jews